Valsa ceratosperma is a plant pathogen infecting apples and pears.

See also
 List of apple diseases
 List of pear diseases

References

Fungal tree pathogens and diseases
Apple tree diseases
Pear tree diseases
Diaporthales
Fungi described in 1937